These are the international rankings of Ukraine.

International rankings

References

Ukraine